Mouhamadou Traoré (born 16 or 18 April 1982 or 1986) is a Senegalese former footballer. He played for various Polish clubs as a striker.

Sources disagree on his birth date and age:
16 April 1982 ( years old)
16 April 1986 ( years old)

References

External links

1980s births
Sportspeople from Thiès
Living people
Senegalese footballers
Association football forwards
Stilon Gorzów Wielkopolski players
Zagłębie Lubin players
Pogoń Szczecin players
GKS Bełchatów players
Sandecja Nowy Sącz players
Siarka Tarnobrzeg players
Ekstraklasa players
I liga players
II liga players
Senegalese expatriate footballers
Expatriate footballers in Poland
Senegalese expatriate sportspeople in Poland
Glinik Gorlice players